Xue Yue (December 26, 1896 – May 3, 1998) was a Chinese Nationalist military general, nicknamed by Claire Lee Chennault of the Flying Tigers as the "Patton of Asia" and called the "God of War" (戰神) by the Chinese.

Early life and career

Born to a peasant family in Shaoguan, Guangdong, Xue joined the Tongmenghui in 1909.  In the Spring of 1912, he was admitted to the Guangdong Military Primary School.  In 1917, he was admitted to the sixth class of the Baoding Military Academy.  However, in July 1918, he departed south for Guangzhou and joined an army created by Sun Yat-sen and Chen Jiongming with the rank of captain.  Afterwards, he became commander of the first battalion of Sun's bodyguard.  When Sun and Chen fell out, Xue escorted Soong Ching-Ling to safety.

Xue was one of the most effective nationalist commanders of the Northern Expedition, serving as the commander of the 1st Division of the 1st Army.  After the April 12 Incident, he recommended that Chiang Kai-shek be arrested as a counterrevolutionary.  Purged from the 1st Army, Xue returned to Guangdong to serve as a divisional commander under Li Jishen.  After political turmoil that saw Chiang return to power, Xue joined Zhang Fakui and served in the Guangdong 4th Army.  During the Guangzhou Uprising, Xue's troops were called into the city to help suppress the Communists.  Due to losses suffered over the course of the latter part of 1927, the 4th Army accepted Chiang's offer to reorganize.  However, internal divisions saw newly appointed commander Miao Peinan forced out and Zhang Fakui's return as commander of the Guangdong 4th Army.  Xue was promoted to become Zhang's deputy.

During the Central Plains War, the Guangdong 4th Army supported the New Guangxi Clique in opposing Chiang.  During the combined forces' entry into Hengyang, their line of retreat was cut off by Jiang Guangnai and Cai Tingkai.  In the ensuing Battle of Hengyang, the combined Guangdong-Guangxi army suffered a serious defeat.  The Guangdong 4th Army was forced to join Chiang, Zhang Fakui was forced to resign, and Xue was promoted to command of the army.

During the first stage of the Chinese Civil War, Generalissimo Chiang Kai-Shek ordered General Xue to lead the Guangdong First Army to attack the Chinese communists during the Fifth Encirclement Campaign against Jiangxi Soviet, forcing them to start the Long March and his forces chased the retreating communists all the way to Sichuan and Guizhou, until the communist forces retreated across the great swamplands and finally escaped to Shaanxi Province. He then turned his forces around and marched unstopped to Central China and defeated the famed Red Army commanders like He Long and Ye Ting of the communist area which they controlled and forced them out of these strongholds. For these accomplishments, Chiang Kai-shek hailed him as "a true example of a Chinese officer".

Second Sino-Japanese War
After the Xi'an Incident, however, Xue's loyalty was in doubt after he offered to personally arrest Chiang Kai-shek and hand him over to the Communists if Chiang refused to fight the Japanese immediately.  Although he immediately reconciled with Chiang Kai-shek, his relations with the KMT were strained throughout the Second Sino-Japanese War.

Xue commanded the 19th Army Group that fought the Battle of Shanghai. Later, during the Campaign of Battle of Northern and Eastern Henan (January–June 1938) he commanded the Eastern Henan Army.

Xue was also involved in the Battle of Wuhan, commanding the 1st Army Corps. In the mountains northwest of Wuhan, Xue succeeded in nearly destroying the entire 106th division of the imperial Japanese army. During the battle, most of the Japanese officers were killed and the Japanese had to air-drop 300 officers by parachutes into the battlefield. This was the only occasion the Imperial Japanese Army had to use airborne strategy to save a whole division from being eliminated by enemy forces during the Second World War.

Xue Yue was also responsible for the victories of the 9th Front, in the First, Second and Third Battle for Changsha. His forces of the 9th Front were also victorious at the Battle of Changde but were defeated in the Fourth Battle of Changsha.

The KMT and General Stilwell would not support him or supply his soldiers with ammunition to fight the Japanese due to Stillwell's belief that there was rampant corruption in the KMT Army that resulted in generals or KMT officials diverting resources away from the battlefield. To Stillwell's dismay, however, Chennault's air forces supplied Xue with ammunition throughout the war, whenever this was possible. Xue's 9th Front was also responsible for protecting Chennault's airfields.

Chennault and Xue became sworn brothers and remained close friends until Chennault's death in 1958.  Chennault also recounts in his memoirs, "Way of a Fighter," that in July 1945, just as Chennault had resigned, he made a trip over enemy lines to see Xue Yue.  (In his memoirs, Chennault refers to Xue Yue as Hsueh Yo).  Xue had marched for two days to get to the meeting, but Chennault was only able to disappoint him in his quest for arms and ammunition to launch a counteroffensive:  Chennault's superiors had taken everything for an effort being organized in Chongqing.  And so:

Chinese civil war and after
After World War II, Xue refused to exchange his gold for the Gold Yuan paper currency as mandated by law.  When Huang Shaoxiong informed Xue that this was illegal, Xue responded that he and his subordinates' gold was paid for in blood and he was personally responsible for it.

When Chiang Kai-shek retreated to Taiwan in 1949, Xue was put in charge of defending Hainan Island. The victorious Red Army defeated the demoralized Nationalist Forces.  Xue left for Taiwan after the defense of Hainan collapsed. In Taiwan, he served as adviser to the chief of staff, in name only. He was Master of Ceremony, an honorary title, at Chiang Kai-shek's funeral in 1975. He lived until 1998 to the age of 101.

References

External links 
 

1896 births
1998 deaths
Chinese centenarians
Men centenarians
People of the Northern Expedition
Chinese military personnel of World War II
Chinese anti-communists
National Revolutionary Army generals from Guangdong
Whampoa Military Academy alumni
People from Shaoguan
Recipients of the Order of Blue Sky and White Sun
Taiwanese people from Guangdong
Chinese Civil War refugees